Gregor Tait (born 20 April 1979) is a Scottish backstroke swimmer, and an Olympic swimmer for Great Britain. He has swum for Great Britain (or Scotland as noted) at the:
Olympics: 2004, 2008
World Championships: 2003, 2005, 2007
Commonwealth Games (Scotland): 2002, 2006
Short Course Europeans: 2001, 2003, 2006

At the 2006 Commonwealth Games, he won the Men's 200m Backstroke in a Games Record, and also won the 200m Individual Medley. In addition, Tait also claimed two bronze medals at the 2006 Games. He was hailed as a "national hero" upon his return by Scotland's First Minister, Jack McConnell.

Tait was born in Glasgow. He is married to the Australian Olympic swimmer Alice Mills.

Personal bests and records held

See also 
 Commonwealth Games records in swimming
 List of Commonwealth Games medallists in swimming (men)

References

External links 
British Swimming athlete profile
British Olympic Association athlete profile

1979 births
People educated at Stirling High School
Male backstroke swimmers
Commonwealth Games bronze medallists for Scotland
Commonwealth Games gold medallists for Scotland
Commonwealth Games silver medallists for Scotland
Living people
Sportspeople from Glasgow
Scottish male swimmers
Swimmers at the 2002 Commonwealth Games
Swimmers at the 2004 Summer Olympics
Swimmers at the 2006 Commonwealth Games
Swimmers at the 2008 Summer Olympics
Olympic swimmers of Great Britain
Commonwealth Games medallists in swimming
Medallists at the 2002 Commonwealth Games
Medallists at the 2006 Commonwealth Games